Mikael Ymer was the defending champion but chose not to defend his title.

Henri Laaksonen won the title after defeating Dennis Novak 6–1, 2–6, 6–2 in the final.

Seeds

Draw

Finals

Top half

Bottom half

References

External links
Main draw
Qualifying draw

2021 ATP Challenger Tour
Singles